Javier Benítez (born 30 June 1976) is an Argentine former athlete specializing in the pole vault. He won multiple medals on continental level.

His personal best jump is 5.40 metres from 2001. He retired from competition in 2011.

Competition record

References
 

1976 births
Living people
Argentine male pole vaulters
Pan American Games competitors for Argentina
Athletes (track and field) at the 2003 Pan American Games
Athletes (track and field) at the 2007 Pan American Games